"Goody Two Shoes" is the debut solo single by Adam Ant, released on 7 May 1982.

History

There are two versions of the cover. The first has Adam and the Ants across the top of the sleeve and the later version just Adam Ant. This is probably due to the confusion around the timing of Ant going solo, particularly as the song was performed by three fifths of the band Ant, Pirroni and Hughes.

There are also two different studio versions of the song. The UK 7" single version is notably different from the re-recorded version which appears on Friend or Foe. The single version has a different, more reverberating drum track. The Friend or Foe version, instead of Hughes on drums, features Bogdan Wiczling, drummer on the rest of the album.

Ant performed "Goody Two Shoes" at Top of the Pops on 20 May 1982.

B-side
Ant sometimes recorded new versions of his pre-1980 compositions for the B-side of his singles. For this single, an old Ant song from 1977 called "Red Scab" was used.

Track listing
All songs written by Adam Ant except as noted.
"Goody Two Shoes" (Adam Ant, Marco Pirroni) – 3:15
"Red Scab" – 4:06

Chart performance

Weekly charts

Year-end charts

Music video

The video presents a stylized vision of a day in the life of Adam Ant, from dressing in the morning to performing on stage, to being hounded by the media. At the end of the day, he takes home a woman journalist played by British actress Caroline Munro, in effect answering the song's theme question, "What do you do?" The video also starred veteran actors Graham Stark and Dandy Nichols, as the butler and cleaning woman respectively.

Other media
"Goody Two Shoes" was featured in the film Hot Fuzz and the television series The Umbrella Academy.

Covers
Punk band Unwritten Law later covered this song.
In 2014, singer-songwriters Jim Boggia and Pete Donnelly released a cover version of the song on the multi-artist compilation album Here Comes The Reign Again: The Second British Invasion.

See also
The History of Little Goody Two-Shoes
List of number-one singles in Australia during the 1980s
List of UK Singles Chart number ones of the 1980s

References

1982 debut singles
1982 songs
Adam Ant songs
CBS Records singles
Epic Records singles
Number-one singles in Australia
Songs written by Adam Ant
Songs written by Marco Pirroni
UK Singles Chart number-one singles
Dance-rock songs